Louis-François Bertin de Vaux (18 August 177123 April 1842) was a French journalist.

Louis was the younger brother of Louis-François Bertin. He took a leading part in the conduct of his brother's paper Journal des Débats, to the success of which his powers of writing greatly contributed. He entered the Chamber of Deputies in 1815, was made Councillor of State in 1827, and a peer of France in 1830.

References

1771 births
1842 deaths
Writers from Paris
Politicians from Paris
Orléanists
Members of the Chamber of Deputies of the Bourbon Restoration
Members of the 1st Chamber of Deputies of the July Monarchy
Members of the 2nd Chamber of Deputies of the July Monarchy
Members of the Chamber of Peers of the July Monarchy
French journalists
French male non-fiction writers